"Easy Go" is a song recorded by Canadian DJ Grandtheft and singer Delaney Jane. The song debuted at number 46 on Billboard's Hot Dance/Electronic Songs chart in the United States and later peaked at number 27.

Music video 
The video stars Jane who was immediately enamored with her Uber driver. She begins to have intense fantasies of the two of them. Most of the video takes place in the back of a car. Jane arrives at her destination before Grandtheft enters the car of a female driver. It was presumed the scene would go on in a cycle.

Composition 
The song begins with some light percussion and a bassline. Delaney Jane then takes the lead with her gentle crooning. The drums plays as a soaring chord progression arises, before rolling snares and rising synths progresses into the drops. It is a future bass workout, utilizing the singer’s a cappella to create a winding melody over 'splashy chord flourishes' and trap rhythms.

Track listing

Single 
 "Easy Go" – 3:10

Remixes 
 "Easy Go" (Hunter Siegel Remix)

Charts

Certifications and sales

References 

2016 songs
2016 singles
Future bass songs
Grandtheft songs